KNEL may refer to:

 KNEL (AM), a radio station (1490 AM) licensed to Brady, Texas, United States
 KNEL-FM, a radio station (95.3 FM) licensed to Brady, Texas, United States
 the ICAO code for Naval Air Engineering Station Lakehurst